This article presents a list of the historical events and publications of Australian literature during 1942.

Books 

 James Aldridge — Signed With Their Honour
 Jean Devanny — The Killing of Jacqueline Love
 Arthur Gask — His Prey Was Man
 Michael Innes — The Daffodil Affair
 Eve Langley — The Pea-Pickers
 Will Lawson — Bound for Callao
 Philip Lindsay
 The Gentle Knight
 Heart of a King
 Nevil Shute
 Most Secret
 Pied Piper

Children's and Young Adult fiction 

 Mary Grant Bruce — Billabong Riders
 Mary Durack & Elizabeth Durack — A Book of Picture Stories
 Dorothy Wall — A Tiny Story of Blinky Bill

Short stories 

 John K. Ewers — "Harvest"
 Alan Marshall — "Blow Carson, I Say"
 Harold Mercer — The Adventures of Mrs. Parsley
 Ivan Southall — Out of the Dawn

Poetry 

 Ethel Anderson — Squatter's Luck and Other Poems
 Rosemary Dobson — "In a Convex Mirror"
 Mary E. Fullerton
 "Lovers"
 "Unit"
 Mary Gilmore — "Nationality"
 James McAuley — "Terra Australis"
 Leonard Mann — "The Earth"
 Ian Mudie — "Retreat of a Pioneer"
 Douglas Stewart — "Old Iron"
 Judith Wright — "The Company of Lovers"

Non-fiction 

 T. Inglis Moore — Six Australian Poets

Awards and honours

Literary

Births 

A list, ordered by date of birth (and, if the date is either unspecified or repeated, ordered alphabetically by surname) of births in 1942 of Australian literary figures, authors of written works or literature-related individuals follows, including year of death.

 5 January — Michael Wilding, novelist and academic
 24 February — David Williamson, playwright
 20 April — Margaret Clark, writer for children
 8 May — Peter Corris, novelist (died 2018)
 10 May — Bob Ellis, journalist (died 2016)
 26 June — Humphrey McQueen, author
 29 August — Gillian Rubinstein, writer for children
 17 October — Nicholas Hasluck, novelist and jurist
 20 October — Bob Graham, author and illustrator
 27 October – Edwin Wilson, poet, painter, botanist (died 2022)
 7 November — Helen Garner, novelist
 12 November — Janette Turner Hospital, novelist

Deaths 

A list, ordered by date of death (and, if the date is either unspecified or repeated, ordered alphabetically by surname) of deaths in 1942 of Australian literary figures, authors of written works or literature-related individuals follows, including year of birth.

 19 January — Mary Gaunt, novelist (born 1861)
 21 January — Dorothy Wall, writer for children (born 1894)
 22 February — Furnley Maurice, poet (born 1881)
 7 May — William Baylebridge, poet and short story writer (born 1883)
 12 May — John Shaw Neilson, poet (born 1872)

See also 
 1942 in poetry
 List of years in literature
 List of years in Australian literature
1942 in literature
1941 in Australian literature
1942 in Australia
1943 in Australian literature

References

Literature
Australian literature by year
20th-century Australian literature
1942 in literature